Loxophlebia pheiodes is a moth of the subfamily Arctiinae. It was described by Paul Dognin in 1914. It is found in Colombia.

References

 Natural History Museum Lepidoptera generic names catalog

Loxophlebia
Moths described in 1914